Spring Island is a nature preserve and island residential community in Beaufort County, South Carolina. It is a 3000-acre coastal Sea Island consists of live oak forest interwoven with waterfront homes.

Amenities

 Two clubhouses
 Two onsite restaurants
 Award-winning golf
 Equestrian center
 Salt water and fresh water fishing
 Kayaking
 Deep water docks
 Over 300 trails
 13,000 sq. ft. sports complex
 Swimming pools
 Tennis courts
 4 acre farm with garden plots
 Nature center
 Sporting clays
 Croquet

Sources:

References

External links
 Official website

Islands of South Carolina
Island resorts
Populated places in Beaufort County, South Carolina
Bodies of water of Beaufort County, South Carolina
Protected areas of Beaufort County, South Carolina
South Carolina Sea Islands